Senna siamea, also known as Siamese cassia, kassod tree, cassod tree and cassia tree, is a legume in the subfamily Caesalpinioideae. It is native to South and Southeast Asia, although its exact origin is unknown.

It is often used as shade tree in cocoa, coffee and tea plantations. In Thailand it is the provincial tree of Chaiyaphum Province and some places in the country are named after it.

Leaves are alternate, pinnately compound, with slender, green-reddish, tinged axis and 6 to 12 pairs of leaflets on short stalks, rounded at both ends.

Uses

This plant has medicinal value and it contains a compound named barakol. The leaves, tender pods and seeds are edible, but they must be previously boiled and the water discarded. They are used in Burmese and also in Thai cuisine where one of the most well-known preparations is kaeng khilek.

In Burmese tradition, during the full moon day of Tazaungmon, Burmese families pick Siamese cassia buds and prepare it in a salad called mezali phu thoke (မယ်ဇလီဖူးသုပ်) or in a soup.

Other uses include as fodder plant, in intercropping systems, windbreaks, and shelter belts.
As a hardwood, it is used for ornamentation on instruments (ukuleles and guitars) and decorative products. In this capacity it is known as pheasantwood or polohala, named for the similarity of the grain to pheasant feathers. It is sometimes used in Chinese furniture (known as jichimu) interchangeably with wood from the Ormosia species.

Vernacular names
, mezali
, khilek

Twi: Nkyedua
Ewe: Zangara gbe
Kiswahili : mhoba

See also
Millettia laurentii
Millettia leucantha
Ormosia

References

External links

FAO - Senna siamea (Lam.) Irwin & Barneby

siamea
Flora of Indo-China
Trees of Thailand
Trees of Vietnam
Thai cuisine
Taxa named by Jean-Baptiste Lamarck
Asian vegetables
Plants described in 1785
Fabales of Asia